History (formerly known as The History Channel) is a Southeast Asian pay television channel broadcasting programming related to historical events and people. The channel is owned by A+E Networks Asia. In India History TV18 owned by a joint-venture between A+E Networks and under permission registered Discovery Communications, owner of the American History and Network 18, Indian media group & available in eight languages (Bengali, English, Gujarati, Hindi, Marathi, Tamil, Telugu & Urdu) in India.

Company 

A+E Networks Asia was formed on 15 June 2007 through a joint venture between A+E Networks and Malaysia's pay TV provider Astro. Headquartered in Singapore, A+E Networks Asia also have operations in Kuala Lumpur, Malaysia.

In 2009, A+E Networks Asia struck a US$800,000 co-production deal with the National Film Development Corporation of Malaysia to co-produce programmes to be featured across its channels. It has recently hired SPE Networks as a regional ad sales representative across the South East Asian region.

High-definition feed
On September 1, 2008, History Channel Asia officially launched their own History HD Asia channel in Singapore and Hong Kong, followed by Japan, South Korea (Localized Version Launched), India, Philippines and Malaysia.

Programming

New
 Alone
 Big Easy Motors
 Counting Cars
 Doomsday: 10 Ways The World Will End
 Forged in Fire
 Gangland Undercover
 Pawn Stars
 Storage Wars
 Six
 Vikings

Reruns

 Duck Dynasty
 Photo Face-Off
 The Pickers
 Top Shot
 Swamp People
 Kings of Restoration
 Cajun Pawn Stars
 Axe Men
 The Innovators: The Men Who Built America
 Ancient Aliens
 America's Book Of Secrets
 Modern Marvels
 Serial Killer Earth
 Stan Lee's Superhumans
 Top Guns
 IRT Deadliest Roads Mankind The Story of All of UsStorage Wars: Texas''

See also 

 A+E Networks
 Bio Asia
 Crime & Investigation Network Asia
 History (U.S. TV channel)

References

External links 
 

A&E Networks
Television channels and stations established in 2007
English-language television stations
Mass media in Southeast Asia